The 2006–07 Croatian First Football League (officially known as Prva HNL Ožujsko for sponsorship reasons) was the sixteenth season of the Croatian First Football League, the national championship for men's association football teams in Croatia, since its establishment in 1992. The season started on 29 July 2006 and ended on 19 May 2007. Dinamo Zagreb were the defending champions, having won their eleventh championship title the previous season, and they defended the title again, after a win against Međimurje on Matchday 29, played on 28 April 2007.

Teams

Stadia and personnel 

 1 On final match day of the season, played on 19 May 2007.

League table

Results

Matches 1–22 
During matches 1–22 each team plays every other team twice (home and away).

Matches 23–33 
During matches 23–33 each team plays every other team once.

Relegation play-off

First leg

Second leg 

Zadar win 6–2 on aggregate and are promoted to 2007–08 Prva HNL.

Top goalscorers

See also 
 2006–07 Croatian Second Football League
 2006–07 Croatian Football Cup

External links 
 Season statistics at HRNogomet
 2006–07 in Croatian Football at Rec.Sport.Soccer Statistics Foundation

Croatian Football League seasons
Cro
Prva Hnl, 2006-07